The Louis Kotzow House is a historic house in Pawtucket, Rhode Island.  It is a -story wood-frame structure, laid out in an L shape.  Its exterior is visually busy, with numerous projecting dormer and gable sections, and elaborate woodwork, including bracketed eaves and applied Stick style woodwork on a projecting bay section. Its porch has a delicate jigsawn railing, with a wooden frieze and decorative arches above. The house, built c. 1875, is one of two (the other is the nearby Scholze–Sayles House) built by the German Land Cooperative Association, which sought to create a German-speaking enclave in the area.

The house was listed on the National Register of Historic Places in 1983.

See also
National Register of Historic Places listings in Pawtucket, Rhode Island

References

Houses on the National Register of Historic Places in Rhode Island
Houses in Pawtucket, Rhode Island
National Register of Historic Places in Pawtucket, Rhode Island